Fedora Media Writer is an open source tool designed to create live media for Fedora Linux.

Features
Cross-platform (available for Linux, macOS, and Windows)
Destructive installer - "overwrites the drive's partition layout though so it also provides a way to restore a single-partition layout with a FAT32 partition"
Supports various Fedora Linux releases
Automatically detects all removable devices
Persistent storage creation, to save all documents created and modifications made to the system
SHA-1 checksum verification of known releases, to ensure there is no corruption when downloading
Not limited to Fedora Linux releases, supports custom images

See also
Fedora Linux
Fedora Project
List of tools to create live media systems

References

External links

fedoralinux.org 
Creating and using a live installation image

Cross-platform software
Live USB
Fedora Project
Linux installation software